Brazoria is a city in the U.S. state of Texas, in the  metropolitan area and Brazoria County. As of the 2020 U.S. Census, the city population was 2,866.

Geography 

Brazoria is located southwest of the center of Brazoria County at  (29.047216, –95.567625). The northeast edge of the community, known as Old Brazoria, is located along the Brazos River. Texas State Highway 36 runs through the center of the city, leading southeast  to Freeport and northwest  to Rosenberg.

Demographics 

As of the 2020 United States census, there were 2,866 people, 1,171 households, and 869 families residing in the city.

As of the census of 2000, there were 2,787 people, 1,063 households, and 736 families residing in the city.  The population density was 1,489.4 people per square mile (575.4/km2).  There were 1,166 housing units at an average density of 623.1 per square mile (240.7/km2).  The racial makeup of the city was 81.95% White, 10.30% African American, 0.57% Native American, 0.68% Asian, 5.38% from other races, and 1.11% from two or more races. Hispanic or Latino of any race were 11.37% of the population.

There were 1,063 households, out of which 34.4% had children under the age of 18 living with them, 53.2% were married couples living together, 11.5% had a female householder with no husband present, and 30.7% were non-families. 26.4% of all households were made up of individuals, and 10.9% had someone living alone who was 65 years of age or older. The average household size was 2.62 and the average family size was 3.18.

In the city, the population was spread out, with 29.3% under the age of 18, 8.8% from 18 to 24, 29.6% from 25 to 44, 20.6% from 45 to 64, and 11.7% who were 65 years of age or older.  The median age was 33 years.  For every 100 females, there were 101.9 males.  For every 100 females age 18 and over, there were 101.3 males.

The median income for a household in the city was $36,058, and the median income for a family was $41,563.  Males had a median income of $35,000 versus $21,543 for females.  The per capita income for the city was $16,666.  About 10.8% of families and 13.3% of the population were below the poverty line, including 15.6% of those under age 18 and 19.3% of those age 65 or over.

History 

Brazoria was founded in 1828 on land granted by Stephen F. Austin to John Austin, who laid out the town. The town's name was selected by John Austin, "for the single reason that I know of none like it in the world". Supposedly, the first Masonic lodge in Texas was founded in 1835 when six men met under the Masonic Oak in Brazoria. The following year, the town was nearly deserted during the Runaway Scrape. H. M. Shaw opened a school in Brazoria in 1838 and a post office opened in 1846. The community's 1884 population was served by 12 general stores, five churches, three hotels, good schools, cotton gins, and sugar mills. By 1890 the town had become the county seat. Two years later the Velasco World weekly newspaper began publishing in the town.

However, the railroad bypassed Brazoria and it lost the county seat to Angleton in 1897. The town went into decline. The Brazoria school boasted three teachers and 142 students in 1906. The Banner weekly news started publishing in 1914. The local discovery of oil and sulphur in 1939 and the construction of a bridge across the Brazos River helped restore the town's fortunes. By 1987 Brazoria counted 50 businesses. Brazoria celebrates Frontier Days in March, the No Name Festival in June, and the Santa Ana Ball in July.

Education 
The city is served by the Columbia-Brazoria Independent School District.

Two public elementary schools serve Brazoria—Barrow Elementary, which is located in the city limits, and Wild Peach Elementary, which is located outside the city limits.  West Brazos Junior High School is also located in Brazoria and serves all junior high school students in the Columbia-Brazoria Independent School District.

Students continue on to Columbia High School. Columbia High School is located the city of West Columbia.

The Texas Legislature assigned the area in Columbia-Brazoria ISD (including Brazosport) to the Brazosport College district.

Government and infrastructure
The Texas Department of Criminal Justice operates the Clemens Unit in an unincorporated area near Brazoria.

The Brazoria Library is a part of the Brazoria County Library System.

Medical services 
Brazoria is served by West Brazos EMS which is operated by Sweeny Community Hospital.  Although there is not a hospital within the city limits, Sweeny Community, Brazosport Regional, Matagorda Regional, and UTMB Angleton-Danbury are all within a driving distance.

Transportation
Eagle Air Park (IATA code BZT) is the city airport.

Climate
The climate in this area is characterized by hot, humid summers and generally mild to cool winters.  According to the Köppen Climate Classification system, Brazoria has a humid subtropical climate, abbreviated "Cfa" on climate maps.

Notable people 

 Sofie Herzog

References

External links

 Brazoria Chamber of Commerce
 Brazoria Heritage Foundation
 Brazos Valley Railroad Society
 Handbook of Texas online

Cities in Brazoria County, Texas
Cities in Texas
Greater Houston